Salvia pogonochila is a perennial plant that is native to the Sichuan province in China, growing in alpine meadows at  elevation.

Notes

pogonochila
Flora of China